Merupu is a 1996 Indian Telugu romantic thriller film, written by Ganapathi Rao Kommanapall and directed by Gopichand Nadella. The film stars Anand, Kasthuri, and Vikram in the leading roles, while Brahmanandam plays a supporting role. The film was later dubbed and released in Tamil as Miss Madras by Sai Bhagyashree Films, and titled as such owing to the actress's triumph at the Miss Madras beauty pageant in 1994.

Cast 
 Anand as Naveen
 Kasthuri as Prema
 Vikram as Guru
 Brahmanandam
 Mallikarjuna Rao
 Siva Parvathi 
 Uttej

Production
The film was loosely based on the 1991 English psychological thriller film, Sleeping with the Enemy. During the making of the film, the writer Kommanapalli Ganapathi Rao associated with newcomer Trivikram Srinivas on working on the script and the pair worked together for ten days. Srinivas later became disassociated with the project as a result of not being paid and the team's shift to shoot portions in Gandipet.

Soundtrack 

The soundtrack album was composed by Bharadwaj. Lyrics by Seetharama Sastry, Jonnavittula and Samavedam Shanmukha Sarma.

References

External links

 https://www.youtube.com/watch?v=J8bUmJYj0ts

1990s Telugu-language films
1996 films
Indian romance films
1990s romance films